Supernumerary means "exceeding the usual number". 

Supernumerary may also refer to:

 Supernumerary actor, a performer in a film, television show, or stage production who has no role or purpose other than to appear in the background, more commonly referred to as an "extra"
 Supernumerary body part, most commonly a congenital disorder involving the growth of an additional part of the body and a deviation from the body plan
 Supernumerary judge, a semi-retired judge appointed to hear cases on a part-time basis
 Supernumerary rainbow, extra colored bands sometimes seen inside the arc of a rainbow
 Jewish Supernumerary Police, a Jewish militia active in the British Mandate of Palestine 
 Small supernumerary marker chromosome (sSMC), an extra, 47th autosomal chromosome 
 Supernumerary sexes (or supernumerary genders), gender categories beyond male and female
 Supernumerary Tooth (or Hyperdontia), referring to the congenital presence of extra teeth
 Supernumerary town, a town in Russian Empire which is not a center of an administrative subdivision of state